In probability theory, a beta negative binomial distribution is the probability distribution of a discrete random variable  equal to the number of failures needed to get  successes in a sequence of independent Bernoulli trials. The probability  of success on each trial stays constant within any given experiment but varies across different experiments following a beta distribution. Thus the distribution is a compound probability distribution.

This distribution has also been called both the inverse Markov-Pólya distribution and the generalized Waring distribution or simply abbreviated as the BNB distribution. A shifted form of the distribution has been called the beta-Pascal distribution.

where

Definition and derivation
Denoting  the densities of the negative binomial and beta distributions respectively, we obtain the PMF   of the BNB distribution by marginalization:

Noting that the integral evaluates to:

we can arrive at the following formulas by relatively simple manipulations.

If  is an integer, then the PMF can be written in terms of the beta function,:
.
More generally, the PMF can be written 

or
.

PMF expressed with Gamma
Using the properties of the Beta function, the PMF with integer  can be rewritten as:
.

More generally, the PMF can be written as
.

PMF expressed with the rising Pochammer symbol
The PMF is often also presented in terms of the Pochammer symbol for integer

Properties

Non-identifiable

Relation to other distributions
It can therefore approximate the geometric distribution arbitrarily well. It also approximates the negative binomial distribution arbitrary well for large .

Heavy tailed
By Stirling's approximation to the beta function, it can be easily shown that for large 

which implies that the beta negative binomial distribution is heavy tailed and that moments less than or equal to  do not exist.

Beta geometric distribution
In this case the pmf simplifies to 

.

This distribution is used in some Buy Till you Die (BTYD) models.

Further, when  the beta geometric reduces to the Yule–Simon distribution. However, it is more common to define the Yule-Simon distribution in terms of a shifted version of the beta geometric. In particular, if  then .

Beta negative binomial as a Pólya urn model

Consider an urn initially containing  red balls (the stopping color) and  blue balls. At each step of the model, a ball is drawn at random from the urn and replaced, along with one additional ball of the same color. The process is repeated over and over, until  red colored balls are drawn. Note, at the end of the experiment, the urn always contains the fixed number  of red balls while containing the random number  blue balls.

By the non-identifiability property,  can be equivalently generated with the urn initially containing  red balls (the stopping color) and  blue balls and stopping when  red balls are observed.

See also
 Negative binomial distribution
 Dirichlet negative multinomial distribution

Notes

References
Johnson, N.L.; Kotz, S.; Kemp, A.W. (1993) Univariate Discrete Distributions, 2nd edition, Wiley    (Section 6.2.3)
Kemp, C.D.; Kemp, A.W. (1956) "Generalized hypergeometric distributions, Journal of the Royal Statistical Society, Series B, 18, 202–211 
Wang, Zhaoliang (2011) "One mixed negative binomial distribution with application", Journal of Statistical Planning and Inference'', 141 (3), 1153-1160

External links
 Interactive graphic: Univariate Distribution Relationships

Discrete distributions
Compound probability distributions
Factorial and binomial topics